Augusta National Golf Club, sometimes referred to as Augusta or the National, is a golf club in Augusta, Georgia, United States. Unlike most private clubs which operate as non-profits, Augusta National is a for-profit corporation, and it does not disclose its income, holdings, membership list, or ticket sales.

Founded by Bobby Jones and Clifford Roberts, the course was designed by Jones and Alister MacKenzie and opened for play in 1932. Since 1934, the club has played host to the annual Masters Tournament, one of the four men's major championships in professional golf, and the only major played each year at the same course. It was the top-ranked course in Golf Digests 2009 list of America's 100 greatest courses and was the number ten-ranked course based on course architecture on Golfweek Magazines 2011 list of best classic courses in the United States.

In 2019, the course began co-hosting the Augusta National Women's Amateur with Champions Retreat Golf Club.

History
Augusta National was founded in 1932 by Bobby Jones and Clifford Roberts on the 365-acre site of a former nursery/antebellum plantation called Fruitland (later Fruitlands). Jones sought to create a world-class winter golf course in his native state of Georgia. During the first decade of the club's existence, membership was low and finances were short due to the Great Depression and the relatively remote location of Augusta, forcing the duo to scrap future plans for a "ladies' course," squash and tennis courts, and various estates.

Its first club professional was Ed Dudley, who served in the role until 1957; Dudley was one of the top tournament professionals of his era, with 15 wins on the PGA Tour.

The Masters was first held in 1934 in an attempt to attract crowds and players. Roberts persuaded Jones, then retired, to return to play in the tournament. (Jones initially was against the name Masters.)

In 1948, Dwight D. Eisenhower and his wife Mamie were personally invited to Augusta by Roberts. Eisenhower took a liking to the club, becoming a member, and hired Roberts as his executor and financial advisor, who had a house (Eisenhower Cabin) constructed for Eisenhower on the grounds. During his presidency, Eisenhower visited Augusta National 29 times.

Facilities and grounds

Augusta is renowned for its well-maintained impeccable appearance: pine needles are imported, bird sounds are played on inconspicuous speakers, and even the ponds were once dyed blue. The club is famed for its azaleas and dogwoods.

Rules and policies imposed on employees, club members, and visitors (referred to internally as "patrons") are notoriously strict. No cell phones or other electronic devices are permitted (except in the press building—spot checks are performed elsewhere); no running or loud talking is allowed; and spectators are not allowed to cheer when a player makes a mistake. Security guards enforce these rules, and are traditionally provided by Pinkerton. Rule-breakers are permanently banned, if not prosecuted when possible.

Other notable facilities include Butler Cabin, near hole 18, "a place of staggering charmlessness and aesthetic death" in a former plantation house where tournament winners are presented with a green jacket; the clubhouse, near hole 1, which dates to the 1850s and has a well-stocked wine cellar; and a practice range. Three large cabins on the property are reserved for tournament sponsors—as of 2020, Mercedes-Benz, IBM, and AT&T.

The club's on-site press building has television studios, a complimentary  restaurant and snack options, staffed bathrooms, and leather chairs. Cameras placed throughout the course are directly connected to the press building's studios via underground cables.

Berckmans Place
Berckmans Place, sometimes called Berckmans or BP, is a 90,000-sq.-ft. non-public shopping and dining complex built in 2012. It operates for one week each year, during the Masters. Entry passes for the week cost $10,000 (up from $6,000) and require Augusta National's approval; there is a 10-ticket limit. As in the rest of the club, neither cell phones nor photography are allowed. The price includes free dining at Berckmans' five full-service restaurants, each of which can seat hundreds of guests: Augusta's Seafood, Calamity Jane's, Ike's Place, MacKenzie's Pub, and the Pavilion. Bathroom stalls are attended and cleaned after each use. There is a pro shop and four putting greens dubbed the "Putting Experience": three slightly smaller replicas of holes 7, 14, and 16; and a "composite course". BP customers can use an exclusive parking lot and entryway (Gate 9). The complex is located near hole 5.

Berckmans Place is named after Belgian Louis Mathieu Berckmans, whose family owned the land the club is built on from 1858 to 1910.

Course

The course was formerly a plant nursery, and each hole on the course is named after the tree or shrub with which it has become associated. Several of the holes on the first nine have been renamed, as well as hole #11.

Lengths of the course for the Masters at the start of each decade:

Unlike most other private or public golf courses in the US, Augusta National has never been rated.  During the 1990 Masters Tournament, a team of USGA raters, organized by Golf Digest, evaluated the course and gave it an unofficial rating of 76.2. It was re-evaluated in 2009 and given an unofficial rating of 78.1.

The course's greens are meticulously maintained to provide a fast and hard golfing surface. This firmness is assisted by an underground irrigation and ventilation system known as the SubAir System, developed and installed in 1994 by course superintendent Marsh Benson. SubAir soon evolved into its own company in nearby Graniteville, South Carolina, designing and installing similar automatic water suction systems in venues such as Pebble Beach, East Lake, Citi Field, and Citizens Bank Park.

The bunkers are filled not with traditional sand but with granulated quartz (known as "Spruce Pine sand" and SP55) which is produced as a byproduct during work at feldspar mines in the Spruce Pine Mining District in and around Spruce Pine, North Carolina. Augusta has been using Spruce Pine sand to fill its forty-four bunkers since the early 1970s, when Clifford Roberts visited Linville Golf Club in Linville, North Carolina, which used the material at the time. Since the mining company providing the sand refused payment, in exchange Roberts offered to host the company owner at Augusta at any time, and later gifted him six Masters passes.

The golf course architecture website GolfClubAtlas.com has said, "Augusta National has gone through more changes since its inception than any of the world's twenty or so greatest courses. To call it a MacKenzie course is false advertising as his features are essentially long gone and his routing is all that is left." The authors of the site also add that MacKenzie and Jones were heavily influenced by the Old Course at St Andrews, and intended that the ground game be central to the course. Almost from Augusta's opening, Roberts sought to make changes to minimize the ground game, and effectively got free rein to do so because MacKenzie died shortly after the course's opening and Jones went into inactivity due to World War II and then a crippling illness. The authors add that "[w]ith the ground game gone, the course was especially vulnerable to changes in technology, and this brought on a slew of changes from at least 15 different 'architects'." Golf Course Histories has an aerial comparison of the architectural changes for Augusta National Golf Club for the year 1938 versus 2013.

Among the changes to the course were several made by architect Perry Maxwell in 1937, including an important alteration involving the current 10th hole. When Augusta National originally opened for play in January 1933, the opening hole (now the 10th) was a relatively benign par 4 that played just in excess of 400 yards. From an elevated tee, the hole required little more than a short iron or wedge for the approach. Maxwell moved the green in 1937 to its present location – on top of the hill, about 50 yards back from the old site – and transformed it into the toughest hole in Masters Tournament history. Ben Crenshaw referred to Maxwell's work on the 10th hole as "one of the great strokes in golf architecture".

For the 1999 tournament, a short rough was instated around the fairways. It is meant to reduce a player's ability to control the ball coming out of this lie, and encourage better accuracy for driving onto the fairway.

Amen Corner
The second shot at the 11th, all of the 12th, and the first two shots at the 13th hole at Augusta are nicknamed "Amen Corner". This term was first used in print by author Herbert Warren Wind in his April 21, 1958, Sports Illustrated article about the Masters that year. In a Golf Digest article in April 1984, 26 years later, Wind told about its origin. He said he wanted a catchy phrase like baseball's "hot-corner" or American football's "coffin-corner" to explain where some of the most exciting golf had taken place (the Palmer-Venturi rules issue at twelve, over an embedded ball ruling and how it was handled, in particular). Thus "Amen Corner" was born. He said it came from the title of a jazz record he had heard in the mid-1930s by a group led by Chicago's Mezz Mezzrow, Shouting in that Amen Corner.

In a Golf Digest article in April 2008, writer Bill Fields offered new updated information about the origin of the name. He wrote that Richard Moore, a golf and jazz historian from South Carolina, tried to purchase a copy of the old Mezzrow 78 RPM disc for an "Amen Corner" exhibit he was putting together for his Golf Museum at Ahmic Lake, Ontario. After extensive research, Moore found that the record never existed. As Moore put it, Wind, himself a jazz buff, must have "unfortunately bogeyed his mind, 26 years later". While at Yale, he was no doubt familiar with, and meant all along, the popular version of the song (with the correct title, "Shoutin' in that Amen Corner" written by Andy Razaf), which was recorded by the Dorsey Brothers Orchestra, vocal by Mildred Bailey (Brunswick label No. 6655) in 1935. Moore told Fields that, being a great admirer of Wind's work over the years, he was reluctant, for months, to come forth with his discovery that contradicted Wind's memory. Moore's discovery was first reported in Golf World magazine in 2007, before Fields' longer article in Golf Digest in 2008.

In 1958, Arnold Palmer outlasted Ken Venturi to win the tournament with heroic escapes at Amen Corner. Amen Corner also played host to Masters moments such as Byron Nelson's birdie-eagle at 12 and 13 in 1937, and Sam Snead's water save at 12 in 1949 that sparked him to victory.  On the flip side of fate, Jordan Spieth's quadruple bogey on 12 during Sunday's final round in 2016 cost him his 2-stroke lead and ultimately the championship.

"The Big Oak Tree"
"The Big Oak Tree" is on the golf course side of the clubhouse and was planted in the 1850s.

Eisenhower Tree

Also known as the "Eisenhower Pine," a loblolly pine was located on the 17th hole, about 210 yards (192 m) from the Masters tee. President Dwight D. Eisenhower, an Augusta National member, hit the tree so many times that, at a 1956 club meeting, he proposed that it be cut down. Not wanting to offend the president, the club's chairman, Clifford Roberts, immediately adjourned the meeting rather than reject the request. In February 2014, the Eisenhower Tree was removed after suffering extensive damage during an ice storm.

Ike's Pond
During a visit to Augusta National, then-General Eisenhower returned from a walk through the woods on the eastern part of the grounds, and informed Clifford Roberts that he had found a perfect place to build a dam if the club would like a fish pond. Ike's Pond was built for Eisenhower to fish in and named after him; the dam is located just where Eisenhower said it should be.

Roberts died of suicide next to Ike's Pond on September 29, 1977.

Rae's Creek
Rae's Creek cuts across the southeastern corner of the Augusta National property.  Rae's Creek runs in front of No. 12 green, has a tributary evident at No. 13 tee, and flows at the back of No. 11 green.  This is the lowest point in elevation of the course.  The Hogan and Nelson Bridges cross the creek after the 12th and 13th tee boxes, respectively.  The creek was named after former property owner John Rae, who died in 1789. It was Rae's house which was the farthest fortress up the Savannah River from Fort Augusta. The house kept residents safe during Indian attacks when the fort was out of reach.

Real estate
Over the decades, Augusta National has bought and redeveloped nearby land. From 1999 to 2019, the club spent about $200 million to buy 100 separate properties totaling over 270 acres, some more than a mile distant from the club proper. Most purchases are arranged via LLCs connected to Augusta National in order to obfuscate the transaction's details. More than a dozen of these LLCs are known to exist, and up to five may be involved in a single purchase. Augusta National ultimately purchases each LLC, acquiring its land holdings and keeping the real estate price away from public records. Non-disclosure agreements are also commonly employed.

Augusta National has acquired, demolished, and redeveloped entire strip centers and residential blocks. The organization helped finance a project to re-route Berckmans Road. The club also built a large tunnel underneath Washington Road connecting to a Global Communication Center that was first used in the 2021 Masters Tournament. The tunnel was built without ever impeding traffic on Washington Rd above, and is large enough for an 18 wheeler to drive through.

Because Augusta National has spent so much to acquire land, homeowners in Richmond County have had to apply for special property tax assessments in order to negate the effects of the club's activities. Investors have also begun to purchase property and condos next to Augusta National.

Membership
Augusta National Golf Club has about 300 members at any given time. Membership is strictly by invitation: there is no application process. In 2004, USA Today published a list of all the current members. Membership is believed to cost between $100,000 and $300,000 and annual dues were estimated in 2020 to be less than $30,000 per year. Club members are sometimes referred to as "green jackets."

For decades, the club barred membership to African Americans. "As long as I'm alive," said co-founder Roberts, who subsequently served as the club's chairman, "all the golfers will be white and all the caddies will be black."

Augusta invited and accepted its first African-American member, television executive Ron Townsend, in 1990 after Shoal Creek Golf and Country Club, an all-white golf club in Alabama, refused membership to African-Americans. The club also faced demands that the PGA Championship not be held there because of racist comments by the club's founder.

In his 2012 pre-Masters press conference, Chairman Billy Payne declined to discuss the club's refusal to admit women. He defended the club's position by noting that in 2011, more than 15% of the non-tournament rounds were played by women who were guests or spouses of active members. However, on August 20, 2012, Augusta National admitted its first two female members: Condoleezza Rice and Darla Moore.

Notable members
Notable current members include: 
Warren Buffett, CEO of Berkshire Hathaway
Pete Coors, former chairman and CEO of Coors Brewing Company and Molson Coors Brewing Company, current chairman of MillerCoors
David Farr, chairman and CEO of Emerson Electric Company
Bill Gates, co-founder and chairman of Microsoft
Lou Gerstner, former IBM executive
Roger Goodell, commissioner of the National Football League
Pat Haden, former NFL player and former athletic director at the University of Southern California
Lou Holtz, former college football coach
Rob Manfred, Commissioner of Major League Baseball
Peyton Manning, former NFL player
Hugh L. McColl Jr., former CEO of Bank of America
Darla Moore, South Carolina businesswoman
Jack Nicklaus, Hall of Fame golfer, six-time Masters champion, and the only Masters champion who is currently a regular member of the club
Sam Nunn, former United States Senator from Georgia
Sam Palmisano, former CEO of IBM
Condoleezza Rice, former United States Secretary of State
James D. Robinson III, former CEO of American Express
Ginni Rometty, chair, president, and CEO of IBM
Matt Rose, former CEO of BNSF Railway
Lynn Swann, former NFL player
Rex Tillerson, former United States Secretary of State, former chairman and CEO of ExxonMobil
Toby S. Wilt, TSW Investments

Deceased members include:
Frank Broyles, college football coach and athletic director at the University of Arkansas
Dwight D. Eisenhower
Freeman Gosden, radio performer and comedian
Melvin Laird, United States Secretary of Defense 
Arnold Palmer, World Golf Hall of Fame member and four-time Masters champion, was also a regular member of the club
Robert Sumner, pastor and author
T. Boone Pickens, Jr., oil tycoon
Jack Welch, CEO of General Electric
Jock Whitney, ambassador and philanthropist who helped finance the film Gone with the Wind
Robert W. Woodruff, president of The Coca-Cola Company and philanthropist

Chairmen
Clifford Roberts (1931–1976)
William Lane (1976–1980)
Hord Hardin (1980–1991)
Jackson T. Stephens (1991–1998)
Hootie Johnson (1998–2006)
Billy Payne (2006–2017)
Fred Ridley (2017–present)

Chairmen serve for an indefinite amount of time. The chairman is the only person officially authorized to publicly discuss the Masters.

In 1966, the governing board of Augusta National passed a resolution honoring founder Bobby Jones with the position of President in Perpetuity.

2002 membership controversy
Augusta National and its then-Chairman Hootie Johnson are widely known for their disagreement, beginning in 2002, with Martha Burk, then chair of the Washington-based National Council of Women's Organizations; the dispute arose over Augusta National's refusal to admit female members to the club. Burk said she found out about the club's policies in a USA Today column by Christine Brennan published April 11, 2002. She then wrote a private letter to Johnson, saying that hosting the Masters Tournament at a male-only club constituted sexism.  Johnson characterized Burk's approach as "offensive and coercive". The club hired consulting firm WomanTrend which ran a survey and found that "Augusta National's membership policies were not topmost on the list of women's concerns"; the poll was called "unethical" by Burk. Responding to efforts to link the issue to sexism and civil rights, Johnson maintained that the issue had to do with the rights of any private club:

Burk, whose childhood nickname was also Hootie, claimed to have been "called a man hater, anti-family, lesbian, all the usual things." Johnson was portrayed as a Senator Claghorn type—"a blustery defender of all things Southern".

Following the discord, two club members resigned: Thomas H. Wyman, a former CEO of CBS, and John Snow, when President George W. Bush nominated him to serve as Secretary of the Treasury. Pressure on corporate sponsors led the club to broadcast the 2003 and 2004 tournaments without commercials. The controversy was discussed by the International Olympic Committee when re-examining whether golf meets Olympic criteria of a "sport practiced without discrimination with a spirit of friendship, solidarity and fair play". Augusta National extended membership to Condoleezza Rice and Darla Moore on August 20, 2012.

In 2018, chairman Fred Ridley announced that the club would establish the Augusta National Women's Amateur Championship in 2019, a 54-hole event for the world's top amateur players.

Green jacket
Every member of Augusta National receives a green sport coat with the club's logo on the left breast. Members are required to wear them during the tournament, and the jackets are not allowed to be removed from the grounds. The idea of the green jacket originated with club co-founder Clifford Roberts. Many believe it is because he wanted patrons visiting during the tournament to be able to readily identify members. Since Sam Snead's victory in 1949, the winner of each year's Masters Tournament has received a green jacket, although he does not receive membership.  The jacket is presented to the new winner by the winner of the previous tournament. If the previous champion is either unavailable or has won consecutive tournaments, then the current chairman acts as the presenter. Until 1967, the jackets were manufactured by Brooks Brothers and since have been made by Hamilton of Cincinnati, Ohio, with the imp wool produced at the Victor Forstmann plant in Dublin, Georgia.

The current Masters champion is the only owner of a green jacket permitted to remove it from the grounds of Augusta National, and only for a period of one year.  Before this time limit was in place, the jacket of a few long-past Masters champions had been sold, after their deaths, to collectors.  Consequently, the members of Augusta National have gone to great lengths to secure the remaining examples. Now, two jackets remain outside the grounds of Augusta National with the club's permission.  When Gary Player first won the Masters in 1961, he brought his jacket home to South Africa. For years the board insisted that Player return the jacket but Player kept "forgetting" or coming up with humorous creative excuses why he did not return the jacket. After becoming something of a running joke,  Augusta National's members allowed him to keep it, where it is on display in his personal museum. The second jacket belongs to 1938 champion Henry Picard. Before the traditions were well established, the jacket was removed by Picard from Augusta National. It is now currently on display in the "Picard Lounge" at Canterbury Golf Club in Beachwood, Ohio. Along with Snead, the nine previous winners were also awarded green jackets in 1949, and these became known as the "original ten" jackets.

Horton Smith's jacket, awarded for his wins in 1934 and 1936, sold at auction in September 2013 for over $682,000; the highest price ever paid for a piece of golf memorabilia. Smith died at age 55 in 1963 and it had been in the possession of his brother Ren's stepsons for decades.

Caddies
Augusta National employs a staff of caddies to assist members, guests, and professionals. Augusta's caddie staff wears trademark white jumpsuits year-round.

Before 1983, staff caddies were assigned to players at the Masters. All four majors and some tour events required the use of the host club's caddies well into the 1970s — the U.S. Open had this policy through 1975 — but by 1980, only the Masters and the Western Open near Chicago retained the requirement. Well-known caddies during this time period include Nathaniel "Iron Man" Avery, Carl Jackson, and Willie "Pappy" Stokes.

More unusually, Augusta employed only black men as caddies. Club co-founder Clifford Roberts once said, "As long as I'm alive, all the golfers will be white and all the caddies will be black." Roberts killed himself at Augusta in 1977; five years later, in November 1982, chairman Hord Hardin announced that players were henceforth permitted to use their regular caddies at the Masters. The announcement arrived seven months after the 1982 tournament, during which many caddies, confused by a Thursday rain delay, failed to show up at the proper time on Friday morning; Hardin received scathing complaint letters from two-time champion Tom Watson and others. In 1983, 12 players employed club caddies, including then-five-time champion Jack Nicklaus, defending champion Craig Stadler, and future two-time champion Ben Crenshaw.

The first female caddie at Augusta was George Archer's daughter Elizabeth in 1983, her 21st event carrying the bag for her father. Archer, the 1969 champion, tied for twelfth, one of his better finishes at Augusta. Today, female caddies remain rare at Augusta and on the PGA Tour; most of the women caddies are professional golfers' regular caddies, such as Fanny Sunesson, who has caddied for several players at the Masters, most notably three-time champion Nick Faldo, and in 2019, Henrik Stenson.

During the pre-tournament events in 2007, Golf Channel's Kelly Tilghman caddied for Arnold Palmer in the par-3 contest. Fuzzy Zoeller's daughter Gretchen was his caddie for his last year as a competitor in the tournament in 2009. Tennis pro Caroline Wozniacki, then-fiancée of Rory McIlroy, caddied for him in the par-3 contests of 2013 and 2014.

Crenshaw won his 1984 and 1995 Masters titles with Augusta National caddie Carl Jackson.

Appearances in video games
Augusta National Golf Club is featured in the Japan-exclusive video game franchise Harukanaru Augusta, which started in 1989. The games were produced by T&E Soft. One of its last titles Masters '98: Haruka Naru Augusta was released for the Nintendo 64.

Augusta National Golf Club and the Masters Tournament are also featured in the video game Tiger Woods PGA Tour 12: The Masters, and has subsequently featured in later iterations of the game. This was the first time that the course has been officially used in the Tiger Woods franchise. In 2021, EA Sports and Augusta National Golf Club announced plans to revive their PGA Tour series, which would once again feature Augusta National Golf Club and the Masters Tournament. In addition, it was also announced that the upcoming title will feature the other 3 majors - the PGA Championship, Open Championship, and the U.S. Open.

Augusta National was also previously used in the 1986 computer game Mean 18, published by Accolade.

Further reading

References

External links

Fruitlands/Augusta National Golf Club, part of a National Park Service Discover Our Shared Heritage Travel Itinerary
Augusta.com coverage from the Augusta Chronicle
Aerial view from Google Maps
Guide to Augusta National at BBC
Guide to Augusta National at Golflink
3D Course Planner at ProVisualizer

Masters Tournament
Golf clubs and courses in Georgia (U.S. state)
Golf clubs and courses designed by Alister MacKenzie
Sports venues in Augusta, Georgia
Men's organizations in the United States
Sports venues completed in 1933
1933 establishments in Georgia (U.S. state)